The Racine Belles were one of the original teams of the All-American Girls Professional Baseball League playing from  through  out of Racine, Wisconsin. The Belles won the league's first championship. The team played its home games at Horlick Field.

History 
In 1943, the Belles claimed the first Championship Title in the league's history. This team was characterized by strong pitching, solid defense, timely hitting and speed on the bases.

Racine won the first half with a 33–10 mark, and finished the regular season with an overall record of 55 wins and 38 losses. Mary Nesbitt led the pitching staff with a 26–13 record for a .667 winning percentage (fifth-best of the league), including 308 innings of work in 47 appearances. She also hit .280, scored 34 runs, and drove in 29 more in 73 games. At a time of the season, Nesbitt put together an 11-game winning streak. Besides Nesbitt, the Belles also counted with Joanne Winter, who posted an 11–11 record, to give the team a strong one-two pitching staff. Slugger right fielder Eleanor Dapkus hit a league-lead 10 home runs, while Sophie Kurys stole a league-best 44 bases and scored 60 runs. Margaret Danhauser, Maddy English, Edythe Perlick and Claire Schillace could be counted on for their bats and solid defense.

The first AAGPBL Championship Series pitted first-half winner Racine against the Kenosha Comets, second-half champ. In the best-of-five series, Racine swept Kenosha to clinch the championship. Nesbitt claimed complete-game victories in Games 1 and 3, and saved Game 2 after Winter ran into trouble in the eight inning. Irene Hickson, who shared the catching duties with Dorothy Maguire, led all-hitters with a .417 average and five RBI in the three games.

In 1946, Anna Mae Hutchison posted a 26–14 record with 102 strikeouts in 51 games, setting an all-time, single-season record for games pitched, and also hurled the first nine-inning no-hitter in Belles history, a 1–0 victory over the Kenosha Comets. Winter finished with a 33–9 record, including 17 shutouts and 183 strikeouts in 46 pitching appearances. The Belles claimed first place with a league-best 74–38 record, and won the semifinal round of playoffs by defeating the South Bend Blue Sox in four games.  In Game 1, English drove in the winning run by hitting a double in the bottom half of the 14th inning. Then, in decisive Game 5 she knocked the winning run with a single in the bottom half of the 17th inning. In this first round series she went 11-for-31 for a .353 average, including her two game-winning RBI. After that, the Belles beat the 1945 champions, the Rockford Peaches, four games to two in the final best-of-seven series to clinch the Championship Title. Throughout the playoffs, Kurys led all players in average, stolen bases and runs. On the other hand, Winter collected four wins in the playoffs, including a 14-inning, 1–0 shutout victory over the Peaches in decisive Game Six. The winning run was scored by Kurys on an RBI-single by Betty Trezza, while Danhauser handled 22 chances flawlessly. During the regular season, the Belles again showed a great defense, notably by infielders Danhauser (1B), Kurys (2B) and English (3B), while Perlick (LF), Schillace (CF) and Dapkus (RF) patrolled the outfield. And moreover, fielding ability and speed on the bases were immensely more crucial and challenging in a dominant pitching league.

Racine's biggest newspaper, The Racine Journal Times, covered every Belles game, which contributed to community interest in the team. Many businesses closed during games to encourage its workers and customers to attend.

After eight successful seasons the Belles lacked the financial resources to keep the club playing in Racine and decided to move to Battle Creek, Michigan at the end of the 1950 season. Some founding team members, including  Danhauser, Dapkus, English, Kurys, Perlick, Schillace and Winter,  were disappointed with the new location and would not make the move. During eight years, the Belles were a close-knit team, always like a family away from home. They thought that all would be different, like a new team, maybe a new manager and, specially, a new location.

For their final season, they moved to Muskegon, Michigan and played as the Muskegon Belles.

Season-by-Season records

All-time players roster 

Bold denotes members of the inaugural roster

Beatrice Arbour
Doris Barr
Annastasia Batikis
Barbara Berger
Erma Bergmann
Rita Briggs
Leola Brody
Geraldine Bureker
Clara Chiano
Gloria Cordes
Rita Corrigan
Dorothy Damaschke
Margaret Danhauser
Shirley Danz
Eleanor Dapkus
Barbara Anne Davis
Irene DeLaby
Julie Dusanko
Elizabeth Emry
Madeline English
Louise Erickson
Fern Ferguson
Josephine Figlo
Mary Flaherty
Edna Frank
Philomena Gianfrancisco
Beverly Hatzell
Ruby Heafner
Irene Hickson
Joyce Hill
Marjorie Hood
Dorothy Hunter
Anna Mae Hutchison
Jane Jacobs
Janet Jacobs
Marie Kazmierczak
Mary Ellen Kimball
Ruby Knezovich
Phyllis Koehn
Irene Kotowicz
Ruth Kramer
Sophie Kurys
Laurie Ann Lee
Sarah Lonetto
Shirley Luhtala
Dorothy Maguire
Gloria Marks
Mildred Meacham
Naomi Meier
Marie Menheer
Norma Metrolis
Dorothy Montgomery
Glenora Moss
Mary Nesbitt
Marjorie Nossek
Anna Mae O'Dowd
Dorothy Ortman
Lavonne Paire
Shirley Palesh
Marguerite Pearson
June Peppas
Edythe Perlick
Marjorie Pieper
Grace Piskula
Jenny Romatowski
Betty Russell
Claire Schillace
Doris Shero
Charlotte Smith
Ruby Stephens
Dorothy Stolze
Lucille Stone
Beverly Stuhr
Virginia Tezak
Annebelle Thompson
Betty Trezza
Georgette Vincent
Frances Vukovich
Martha Walker
Thelma Walmsley
Rossey Weeks
Margaret Wenzell
Dorothy Wind
Joanne Winter
Agnes Zurowski

Chaperones 
Virginia Carrigy
Irene Hickson
Mildred Wilson

Notable achievements 
 In 1945 the team won the attendance trophy for having the largest audience on opening night, May 23, with 4,019 fans.
 The Belles were the first team in the AAGPBL to sponsor a junior team. The Junior Belles were local high school girls who played on four teams, the Golds, the Greens, the Reds, and the Grays. Their coaches, uniforms, and equipment were provided by Western Publishing, the sponsor for the professional Belles.
 Although the 1992 film A League of Their Own features the Racine Belles, all of the characters playing on the team were fictional, and ballpark scenes were filmed in Evansville, Indiana. Nonetheless, the Belles did win the league championship in 1943, but over the Kenosha Comets, not the Rockford Peaches as the movie depicts.

Fastpitch 
Previously, a minor league team also named Racine Belles played in the Wisconsin–Illinois League from 1909 through 1913, and then in the Bi-State League in 1915. It was a Class D team in 1909 and 1915, and a Class C team from 1910 to 1913.

The name Racine Belles now refers to a non-profit organization dedicated to the development of girls' fastpitch softball in southeastern Wisconsin.

References

Sources 
 Berlage, Gai Ingham. Charley Gerard. Women in Baseball: The Forgotten History. Greenwood Publishing Group, 1994. 
 Brown, Patricia I. A League of My Own: Memoir of a Pitcher for the All-American Girls. Macfarland & Company, 2003. 
 Heaphy, Leslie A.; Mel Anthony May. Encyclopedia of Women and Baseball. McFarland & Company, 2006. 
 Johnson, Susan. When Women Played Hardball. Seal Press, 1994. 
 Karls, Alan R. Racine's Horlick Athletic Field: Drums Along the Foundries. The History Press, 2014. 
 Macy, Sue. A Whole New Ball Game: The Story of the All-American Girls Professional Baseball League. Puffin, 1995. 
 Madden, W. C. All-American Girls Professional Baseball League Record Book. McFarland & Company, 2000. 
 Madden, W. C. The Women of the All-American Girls Professional Baseball League: A Biographical Dictionary. McFarland & Company, 2005. 
 Porter, David L. Biographical Dictionary of American Sports. Greenwood Press, 2000.

External links 
All-American Girls Professional Baseball League History
All-American Girls Professional Baseball League official website – Racine Belles seasons
All-American Girls Professional Baseball League official website – Player/Profile Search Results

All-American Girls Professional Baseball League teams
1943 establishments in Wisconsin
1950 disestablishments in Wisconsin
Baseball teams established in 1943
Baseball teams disestablished in 1950
Sports in Racine, Wisconsin
Defunct baseball teams in Wisconsin
Women's sports in Wisconsin